(The Spirit gives aid to our weakness), 226, is a motet by Johann Sebastian Bach, composed in Leipzig in 1729 for the funeral of Johann Heinrich Ernesti.

History 
For  , the autograph score survives. Bach himself noted on its title: "." ( – Motet for two choirs for the funeral for the blessed Rector, Professor Ernesti, by J. S. Bach). Ernesti was professor of poetry at Leipzig University and director of the Thomasschule. The first performance took place in the Paulinerkirche, the university church). Scholars debate if the performance was 24 October, or rather 21 October, as indicated by the title page of the sermon.

Bach wrote a number of works for occasions of Leipzig University. Twelve such works survive: they are mainly festive in character (in German they have been categorised as Festmusiken zu Leipziger Universitätsfeiern). 
As well as being part of a series of works connected with the university, Der Geist hilft unser Schwachheit auf as a funeral motet is one of a series of Bach motets.

Text 
The text is taken from the Epistle to the Romans and Martin Luther's third stanza to the hymn "" (1524). Ernesti himself had chosen the text from the epistle for the funeral sermon.

Scoring and structure 

The motet is structured in three movements and scored for two four-part choirs. They sing together in movements 2 and 3. The orchestral parts are extant, indicating that choir I was doubled by strings, choir II by reeds (two oboes, taille and bassoon). For the basso continuo, separate violone and organ parts are provided.

Music 

Bach composed the text according to its meaning, not as music for mourning. The opening contrasts two choirs in imitation. In lively 3/8 time, the word "" (Spirit) is illustrated by a lively melismatic figure. The following idea, "" (but the Spirit itself intercedes for), is given as a fugue, first with independent entrances of all eight parts, but concentrated to four parts in the end, "" (with unutterable sighs). The sighs are audible in the broken melodic lines of all voices. Here the word "" (saints) is illustrated in extended melismatic writing. The closing Pentecostal chorale is set for four parts.

References

Sources 
 
 Motets BWV 225-231 history, scoring, sources for text and music, translations to various languages, discography, discussion, bach-cantatas website
 Bach Motet Translations / BWV 226 - "Der Geist hilft unsrer Schwachheit auf" English translation, discussion, Emmanuel Music
 Der Geist hilft unser Schwachheit auf history, scoring, Bach website 
 BWV 226 Der Geist hilft unser Schwachheit auf English translation, University of Vermont

Further reading 
 Klaus Hofmann: Johann Sebastian Bach. Die Motetten. Bärenreiter, Kassel 2003, .

External links 
 Der Geist hilft unsrer Schwachheit auf, BWV 226: performance by the Netherlands Bach Society (video and background information)
 Johann Sebastian Bach (1685–1750) / Der Geist hilft unser Schwachheit auf klassika.info 
 Free MP3 recording of Der Geist hilft unser Schwachheit auf – BWV 226 from Umeå Akademiska Kör

Motets by Johann Sebastian Bach
Christian funeral music
1729 compositions